Petzenkirchen is a market town in the district of Melk in the Austrian state of Lower Austria.

Population

Geography

Petzenkirchen is located in the Mostviertel which is part of Lower Austria. The area of the market town is 2.89 square kilometres. Adjacent municipalities are the town of Wieselburg and the village of Bergland.

References

Cities and towns in Melk District